Jay Kenneth Johnson (born February 24, 1977) is an American actor from Springfield, Missouri. He began his career in 1999 when he was cast as Philip Kiriakis on the NBC soap opera Days of Our Lives.

Early life 
Johnson was born to parents Janice and Ken Johnson on February 24, 1977, in Missouri. He graduated from Kickapoo High School in 1995. He attended the Missouri State University, where he majored in Business and theatre. He then moved to Los Angeles to pursue an acting career. He has two younger siblings, Jeff and Jenna.

Career 
He has had roles on The Young and the Restless, Days of Our Lives, and North Shore and won a role in the Aaron Spelling pilot Hotel. In addition to his regular television roles, Johnson has had guest appearances on The OC and the show Miami 7.

In 2005, Johnson was offered a role on the new ABC sitcom Hot Properties, a role he later turned down.. He guest-starred on CSI: NY and will be starring in his first feature film titled HACK!. He went on to play "JD", a trapped soul who came back to life 50 years later, on Charmed. In 2006, he was a guest star on CSI: Miami. In 2007, after a five-year absence, Johnson returned to Days of Our Lives as Philip Kiriakis. He has also had a recurring guest role on Scrubs as Dr. Matthews. In 2011, Johnson opted to exit Days of Our Lives. In 2012, he starred in the Hallmark movie Undercover Bridesmaid as Chip.

In 2019, Johnson reprised the role of Philip in the digital-only Last Blast Reunion series. In 2020, it was revealed that he would again reprise the role on Days of Our Lives.

Filmography

References

External links

1977 births
American male soap opera actors
Living people
Male actors from Missouri